Dániel Sós (born 10 August 1998) is a Hungarian swimmer. He competed in the men's 200 metre individual medley event at the 2017 World Aquatics Championships.

References

1998 births
Living people
Hungarian male swimmers
Place of birth missing (living people)
Male medley swimmers
Swimmers at the 2015 European Games
European Games competitors for Hungary